The LM/DC Tour is a co-headlining concert tour by American singers Lea Michele and Darren Criss. It is Michele's second headlining tour, promoting her second studio album Places (2017), and Criss' second concert tour, promoting his third extended play Homework (2016). The co-headlining tour began on May 30, 2018, in Nashville and concluded on December 7, 2018 in Birmingham.

Background
On April 9, 2018, Michele and Criss announced on The Ellen DeGeneres Show that they would go on tour together.

In September 2018, further dates were announced including Las Vegas, Salt Lake City, Phoenix and multiple cities in California. The tour was later expanded to Dublin and the United Kingdom.

Set list
This set list is representative of the show in Pittsburgh on June 2, 2018. It is not representative of all concert set lists for the duration of the tour.

Michele and Criss
"Broadway Baby"
"Suddenly Seymour"
"Falling Slowly"
Michele
"Cannonball"
"Battlefield"
"Don't Rain on My Parade"
"Maybe This Time"
"Poker Face" / "The Edge of Glory"
"Glitter in the Air"
"Run to You"
Michele and Criss
"Getaway Car"
"Cough Syrup" / "Hopelessly Devoted to You"
Criss
"Going Nowhere"
"I Don't Mind"
"I Dreamed a Dream"
"Genie in a Bottle"
"Foolish Thing"
"Not Alone"
"Teenage Dream"
Michele and Criss
"The Coolest Girl"
"This Time"
"Don't You Want Me" / "Make You Feel My Love"

Notes 
On the October 26, 2018, Las Vegas show, "Shallow" was added to the setlist for the remainder of the tour.

Tour dates

Box office score data

References

External links
 

2018 concert tours
Co-headlining concert tours
Lea Michele